Maleyev (masculine) or Maleyeva (feminine) is a Russian surname. Notable people with the surname include:

Aleksandr Maleyev (born 1947), Soviet artistic gymnast
Artemi Maleyev (born 1991), Russian footballer

Russian-language surnames